Oleg Ivanovich Teryokhin (born 12 August 1970 ) is a Russian football coach and a former player.

Honours
 Russian Premier League runner-up: 2000.
 Russian Premier League bronze: 1997.
 Russian Cup winner: 2000, 2001, 2004.
 All-time top scorer for FC Dynamo Moscow in the Russian Premier League: 67 goals.
 Top 33 players year-end list: 1997, 1998, 1999.
 The only player to score at least 100 goals in both Russian Premier League and Russian First Division.
 Russian First League Zone Center top scorer: 1992 (27 goals).

International career
Teryokhin played his only game for Russia on 23 September 1998 in a friendly against Spain.

External links 
 Player profile 

1970 births
People from Engels, Saratov Oblast
Living people
Soviet footballers
Russian footballers
Russia international footballers
FC Dynamo Moscow players
Russian Premier League players
FC Lokomotiv Moscow players
FC Kuban Krasnodar players
FC Chernomorets Novorossiysk players
FC Akhmat Grozny players
FC Salyut Belgorod players
FC Sokol Saratov players
Russian football managers
Association football forwards
Sportspeople from Saratov Oblast